This is a list of the seasons completed by the Washington Huskies men's basketball team.

Seasons

References

 
Washington Huskies
Washington Huskies basketball